Roger Anthony Black MBE (born 31 March 1966) is an English former athlete who competed internationally for Great Britain and England. During his athletics career, he won individual silver medals in the 400 metres sprint at both the Olympic Games and World Championships, two individual gold medals at the European Championships, and 4 × 400 metres relay gold medals at both the World and European Championships.

Since retiring from athletics, he has worked as a television presenter and motivational speaker. In 2008, Black joined forces with fellow athlete Steve Backley and founded BackleyBlack LLP. Black has a collection of fifteen medals from major senior athletics competitions to add to his two European junior championship gold medals.

Black won five national outdoor championships at 400 metres, and one at 200 metres. As of July 2022, Black remains ranked joint third in the all-time Great Britain lists for the 400 metres.

Early life
He was born in Gosport, Hampshire, to David (a doctor) and Thelma, with a twin sister Julia. He attended Alverstoke Church of England Primary School and Portsmouth Grammar School, becoming Head Boy in 1983/84. It was whilst playing football with a local team (RPFC) that he began demonstrating his prowess as a runner, scoring numerous goals as a flying forward leaving many defenders in his wake. He then joined athletics clubs, re-took one of his A-level exams and began studying medicine at the University of Southampton, but he left his course after three months as he had begun to achieve success as an athlete.

Athletics career
Black rose to prominence in 1985 when he won the European Junior Championships 400 m in a time of 45.43 at the age of 19.

In 1986, Black graduated to the senior ranks and made a spectacular impact first winning at the Commonwealth Games in Edinburgh in 45.57, and then at the European Championships in Stuttgart, winning in a time of 44.59, his first British Record, breaking Derek Redmond's 44.82 record from the previous year. Having also won golds in both 4 × 400 m relays at both of those events as well, Black's 1986 season had turned into a gold rush of four gold medals.

His next three seasons were wiped out through illness and injuries and he only just made the relay team for the 1987 World Championships in Rome, where the GB team won the silver medal. He returned to the track in 1990 and his good form took him to the European Championships again, which were held in Split. Black contested the 400 m final and retained his title with a time of 45.11, holding off his old rival Thomas Schönlebe. He then anchored the GB team to an easy 4 × 400 m victory winning by a margin of 15 metres, and a European record of 2:58.23, with his split time of 43.9. He thus achieved a rare double-double – two gold medals at consecutive championships.

Black's outstanding 1990 season was followed by the 1991 World Championship season holding much expectation. His early season form at Crystal Palace saw him beat Olympic Champion Steve Lewis and Antonio Pettigrew but only to lose to a new athlete called Michael Johnson. Johnson would not contest the 400 m at the World Championships meaning the 400 m would be a contest between Black, Pettigrew and Danny Everett as the main contenders.

Black finished second in the individual 400 m in Tokyo to Antonio Pettigrew. Black put in his effort on the third 100 m and entered the home straight two metres up on Pettigrew. He then tired and was caught on the line. Pettigrew's time was 44.57 and Black finished in 44.62. Everett also nearly caught Black on the line; his time was 44.63.

Pettigrew later admitted the use of performance-enhancing drugs from 1997 onwards in June 2008. No clear evidence has emerged, and Pettigrew never admitted anything further before his 2010 suicide, of him using performance-enhancing drugs during the 1991 season.

In the final event of the Tokyo Championships, the men's 4 x 400 relay was billed as a two-way contest between the Great Britain team and the United States team. In an unusual change of tactics, the GB team members decided to put Black on the opening leg, followed by Redmond, then John Regis and, on anchor, the 400 m hurdler Kriss Akabusi. Black later explained the tactics were to put him as first runner to give the team a lead or at least keep the team in close contention. Black's leg was 44.6 from a standing start. Redmond's leg was 44.1, though he conceded the lead to Quincy Watts. Regis followed Everett round the third lap, clocking 44.3. While Everett handed to Pettigrew with a two-metre lead, Regis handed to Akabusi. Akabusi sat in behind the World Champion Pettigrew for the first 200 m of the final lap, closed around the crown of the final bend and then the much improved Akabusi kicked past Pettigrew in the final 80 m to pull off a spectacular victory, winning in a time of 2:57.53 – a British and European record time.

Black set a new British Record of 44.37 seconds on 3 July 1996 in Lausanne, Switzerland. This was subsequently broken a year later by Iwan Thomas who shaved 0.01s from Black's time. Fellow GB athlete Mark Richardson also equalled Black's mark in 1998. As of July 2022, Black's time still stands as the third fastest of all time recorded by a British runner.

His greatest individual achievement in track and field was in the 1996 Olympics in Atlanta when in the final of the 400 m he finished in second place behind Michael Johnson, winning the silver medal in the process.  However, partly due to injuries, he never rediscovered this form, and subsequently retired from the sport only two years later in 1998 after he was not selected for the 1998 European Championships.

Black was coached by Mike Smith and Mike Whittingham, and was sponsored by Reebok.

1997 World Championships
The World Championships' 4 × 400 m originally saw the USA beat Great Britain by 0.18 seconds in a thrilling finale. Subsequently, US athlete, Antonio Pettigrew admitted to using performance-enhancing substances during this period.

On 7 January 2010, it was announced that Great Britain's 1997 World Championship 4 × 400 m relay team are to be awarded the gold medal due to the disqualification of the USA team.

Black, running second leg, tied up and lost ground to his old rival Pettigrew but Jamie Baulch and Mark Richardson held second place round the last two laps. Great Britain's time of 2:56.65 was just outside the time they achieved in Atlanta the previous year.

Awards
Black was appointed Member of the Order of the British Empire (MBE) in the 1992 New Year Honours for services to athletics. In 1995 Southampton University gave Black an honorary degree.

Television career
In 1998 Black appeared on the children's news programme Newsround with fellow athlete Iwan Thomas reporting on childhood obesity.

Black has worked regularly for the BBC on programmes such as Tomorrow's World and Grandstand. In 2004 he was one of the celebrities that took part in the pro-am dancing contest Strictly Come Dancing on BBC One. In September 2006, he took part in BBC One's Celebrity MasterChef programme, reaching the final along with Matt Dawson and Hardeep Singh Kohli.

He was the subject of This Is Your Life in 1999, when he was surprised by Michael Aspel at Heathrow Airport.

Writing
Black has written an autobiography, published by Andre Deutsch, entitled How Long's the Course?,

Personal life
Black is married to Julia Burgess, with whom he had twin boys George and Max in 2006. Black also has a daughter, Isabelle from his previous marriage to Elsa Devassoigne. Despite being born in Gosport, and attending the prestigious Portsmouth Grammar School, Black is a supporter of Southampton F.C. In August 2014, Black was one of 200 public figures who were signatories to a letter to The Guardian opposing Scottish independence in the run-up to September's referendum on that issue.

Achievements
 1985
 European Junior Championships – Cottbus, Germany
 400 metres gold medal – 45.36 seconds
 4 x 400 m. relay gold medal – 3:07.18
 1986
 Commonwealth Games – Edinburgh, Scotland
 400 m. gold medal – 45.57 sec.
 4 x 400 m. relay gold medal – 3:07.19
 European Championships – Stuttgart, Germany
 400 m. gold medal – 44.59 sec.
 4 x 400 m. relay gold medal – 2:59.84
 1987
 World Championships – Rome, Italy
 4 x 400 m. relay silver medal
 1990
 European Championships – Split, Yugoslavia
 400 m. gold medal – 45.08 sec.
 4 x 400 m. relay gold medal – 2:58.22
 1991
 World Championships – Tokyo, Japan
 400 m. silver medal – 44.62 sec.
 4 x 400 m. relay gold medal – 2:57.53
 1992
 Summer Olympics – Barcelona, Spain
 4 x 400 m. relay bronze medal – 2:59.73
 1994
 European Championships – Helsinki, Finland
 400 m. silver medal – 45.2 sec.
 4 x 400 m. relay gold medal – 2:59.13
 1996
 Summer Olympics – Atlanta, USA
 400 m. silver medal – 44.41 sec.
 4 x 400 m. relay silver medal – 2:56.60
 1997
 World Championships – Athens, Greece
 4 x 400 m. relay gold medal – 2:56.65

References

External links
 Roger Black Homepage
 Roger Black MBE Motivational Speaking Profile and Video
 

Living people
1966 births
English male sprinters
Olympic athletes of Great Britain
Olympic bronze medallists for Great Britain
Olympic silver medallists for Great Britain
Athletes (track and field) at the 1992 Summer Olympics
Athletes (track and field) at the 1996 Summer Olympics
Commonwealth Games gold medallists for England
Athletes (track and field) at the 1986 Commonwealth Games
World Athletics Championships medalists
European Athletics Championships medalists
BBC sports presenters and reporters
English television presenters
Members of the Order of the British Empire
People educated at The Portsmouth Grammar School
People from Gosport
Medalists at the 1996 Summer Olympics
Medalists at the 1992 Summer Olympics
Olympic silver medalists in athletics (track and field)
Olympic bronze medalists in athletics (track and field)
Commonwealth Games medallists in athletics
World Athletics Championships winners
Medallists at the 1986 Commonwealth Games